Expo Center is a light rail station on the MAX Yellow Line in Portland, Oregon, United States. It is the last stop northbound on the Interstate MAX extension.

This station is a large park-and-ride station located on the grounds of the Portland Expo Center. It is set up as a modified side platform station, with the two platforms serving three tracks. The extra track allows the storage of an overflow train for events at the Expo Center. The 300 park-and-ride spaces are free for commuters arriving before 10 am on weekdays for a maximum 24 hours. At all other times, drivers must pay the Expo Center's usual $7–8 parking fee.

Although tracks and electrification end directly inside the station, it is designed to allow a future northbound extension (to Vancouver, Washington) to be easily constructed.

Both the landscaping and the artwork at the station are themed in a Japanese style. This recalls the temporary Civilian Assembly Center that existed here during the early days of World War II, which processed Japanese-Americans upon the enforcement of Executive Order 9066.

Bus line connections
This station is at the Expo Center served by the following bus line:
11 - Rivergate/Marine Dr

Unique station features
The station includes several unique decorative features relating to the internment camp theme:
Timber Gateway: Traditional Japanese Gates, with steel internment tags strung among them
Bronze Trunks: Provide additional seating.
Bamboo Glass Blocks
Plaque: A plaque showing the prohibited area as defined in Exclusion Order #26 for those of Japanese ancestry, both alien and non-alien.

References

External links

Station information from TriMet
MAX Light Rail Stations – more general TriMet page
Park and Ride Locations – general TriMet page

2004 establishments in Oregon
Kenton, Portland, Oregon
MAX Light Rail stations
MAX Yellow Line
Railway stations in Portland, Oregon
Railway stations in the United States opened in 2004